12 Comae Berenices is a binary star system in the northern constellation of Coma Berenices. It is the brightest member of the Coma Cluster and is visible to the naked eye with an apparent visual magnitude of 4.80. Although listed as a suspected variable star, there is no photometric evidence of it being variable in luminosity. However, the radial velocity was found to be variable, as announced by W. W. Campbell in 1910. The first orbital solution was published by Vinter Hansen in the 1940s. It is a double-lined spectroscopic binary with an orbital period of 396.5 days and an eccentricity of 0.566.

This system consists of two stars, an evolved F-type giant star and a smaller but higher temperature A-type main-sequence star. Griffin and Griffin (2011) suggested that the secondary component may have begun its evolution away from the main sequence, and instead assigned it a luminosity class of IV. The primary, designated component A, has 2.6 times the mass of the Sun and has expanded to 8.9 times the Sun's radius. It is radiating 56 times the Sun's luminosity from its enlarged photosphere at an effective temperature of 5,300 K. Its companion, component B, has double the Sun's mass and 2.5 times the radius. It shines with 30 times the luminosity of the Sun at 8,500 K.

References

F-type giants
A-type main-sequence stars
Spectroscopic binaries
Coma Berenices
Durchmusterung objects
Comae Berenices, 12
107700
060351
4707